This is a list of all awards won by players and personnel of the Pittsburgh Pirates professional baseball team.

Awards

Most Valuable Player Award
Andrew McCutchen (2013)
Barry Bonds (1990, 1992)
Willie Stargell (1979)
Dave Parker (1978)
Roberto Clemente (1966)
Dick Groat (1960)
Paul Waner (1927)

Cy Young Award 
Doug Drabek (1990)
Vern Law (1960, MLB)

Rookie of the Year Award 
Jason Bay (2004)

Manager of the Year Award 
Clint Hurdle (2013)
Jim Leyland (1990, 1992)

Golden Gloves
Pitcher
Harvey Haddix (1959, 1960)
Bobby Shantz (1961)
Rick Reuschel (1985, 1987)
Catcher
Tony Peña (1983, 1984, 1985)
Mike LaValliere (1987)
Jacob Stallings (2021)
First base

Second base
Bill Mazeroski (1958, 1960, 1961, 1963, 1964, 1965, 1966, 1967)
José Lind (1992)
Third base

Shortstop
Gene Alley (1966, 1967)
Jay Bell (1993)
Outfield
Roberto Clemente (1961, 1962, 1963, 1964, 1965, 1966, 1967, 1968, 1969, 1970, 1971, 1972)
Bill Virdon (1962)
Dave Parker (1977, 1978, 1979)
Andy Van Slyke (1988, 1989, 1990, 1991, 1992)
Barry Bonds (1990, 1991, 1992)
Nate McLouth (2008)
Andrew McCutchen (2012)
Starling Marte (2015, 2016)
Corey Dickerson (2018)

Wilson Defensive Player of the Year Award

See explanatory note at Atlanta Braves award winners and league leaders.
Team (at all positions)
 (2012)
 (2013)

Catcher (in MLB)
Russell Martin (2014)

Left fielder (in MLB)
Starling Marte (2015)

Silver Slugger Award

Pitcher
Don Robinson (1982)
Rick Rhoden (1984, 1985, 1986)
Catcher

First base

Second base
Johnny Ray (1983)
Neil Walker (2014)

Third base
Pedro Álvarez (2013)

Shortstop
Jay Bell (1993)
Jack Wilson (2004)
Outfield
Bobby Bonilla (1988, 1990, 1991)
Andy Van Slyke (1988, 1992)
Barry Bonds (1990, 1991, 1992)
Andrew McCutchen (2012, 2013, 2014, 2015)

Trevor Hoffman NL Reliever of the Year Award

Mark Melancon (2015)

Comeback Player of the Year Award 
Francisco Liriano (2013)
Vern Law (1964)
Willie Stargell (1978)
Rick Reuschel (1985)

All-Star Game MVP Award 
Dave Parker (1979)

Roberto Clemente Award 
Willie Stargell (1974)
Andrew McCutchen (2015)

DHL Hometown Heroes (2006)
Roberto Clemente — voted by MLB fans as the most outstanding player in the history of the franchise, based on on-field performance, leadership quality and character value

Players Choice Awards Outstanding Player (NL)

Andrew McCutchen (2012, 2013)

Players Choice Awards Outstanding Rookie (NL)

Jason Bay (2004)

Players Choice Awards Comeback Player (NL)

Barry Bonds (1992)
Francisco Liriano (2013)

Ford C. Frick Award 

Bob Prince (1986)
Milo Hamilton (1992)

Dapper Dan Sportsman of the Year 
										
Rip Sewell (1943)					
Frankie Frisch (1944)
Bill Meyer (1948)					
Ralph Kiner (1947, 1949)				
Murry Dickson (1951)				
Dale Long (1956)							
Dick Groat (1957, 1960)				
Danny Murtaugh (1958, 1970, 1971)
Roy Face (1959)					
Roberto Clemente (1961, 1966, 1971)
Vernon Law (1965)
Steve Blass (1968)									
Willie Stargell (1971, 1979)								
Dave Parker (1978)				
Syd Thrift (1987)		
Jim Leyland (1990)				
Jay Bell (1993)
Jason Kendall (2000)
Andrew McCutchen (2012)
Clint Hurdle (2013)

Team award

1971 – Warren C. Giles Trophy (National League champion)
 – World Series Trophy
1979 – Warren C. Giles Trophy (National League champion)
 – World Series Trophy
 – Baseball America Organization of the Year

Minor league system

Minor League Player and Pitcher of the Year

Team records (single-season and career)

Franchise records
See: Pittsburgh Pirates#Franchise records

Other achievements

Hall of Famers
See: Pittsburgh Pirates#Baseball Hall of Fame

Retired numbers
See: Pittsburgh Pirates#Retired numbers

Associated Press Athlete of the Year

Willie Stargell (1979)

Sporting News Sportsman of the Year
See: Sporting News#Sportsman of the Year

Sports Illustrated Sportsperson of the Year

Willie Stargell (1979; with Terry Bradshaw)

No-Hitters

 On September 20, Nick Maddox, a 20-year-old rookie, threw the first no-hitter for the Pittsburgh Pirates baseball club. Through 1907 and  Maddox won 20 of his 30 starts, making him the fastest pitcher to ever reach 20 games. This mark will be tied in the future by three other pitchers, but never beaten. Maddox won the third game of the 1909 World Series over Detroit, but was released in  after winning only two games.
 The Pirates waited decades later for their next no-hitter, which was delivered by Cliff Chambers against the Boston Braves in Boston, a 3-0 victory, on May 6, . Chambers walked eight and had one wild pitch, and he also drove in the third run in the 8th inning. For Chambers, this was his last victory in a Pirates uniform. 
 Bob Moose no-hit the New York Mets in New York on September 20, which became the 5th no-hitter recorded by National League pitchers, a record at the time. Moose later moved into a relief role, and in  led the Pirates in saves.
 Dock Ellis might be considered the most notorious no-hitter pitcher. In his autobiography, Dock Ellis in the Country of Baseball, Ellis revealed that he pitched his no-hitter against the San Diego Padres while under the influence of LSD.  Ellis won the game 2-0, receiving his support from two Willie Stargell home runs.
 John "The Candy Man" Candelaria threw his no-hitter against the Los Angeles Dodgers on August 9, 1976, winning 2-0. Candelaria got out of a bases-loaded jam in the 3rd inning to preserve his no-hit shut out. It was the first no-hitter thrown in Pittsburgh by a Pirate since Nick Maddox in 1907.
 July 12,  was Pittsburgh's first non-Opening Day sellout since ; the crowd of 44,119 saw Francisco Córdova and Ricardo Rincón pitch 10 innings of no-hit, shut out baseball against the Houston Astros. The Pirates were held scoreless through nine innings, meaning the game would need extra innings. Rincon came in to relieve Córdova, who had thrown 121 pitches, in the 10th inning, and Rincón completed the performance by pitching a single inning of no-hit baseball. Rincon got the win when Mark Smith hit a three-run, pinch hit home run in the bottom of the 10th.

League leaders

Batting Champions

Ed Swartwood (1883)
Honus Wagner (1900, 1903, 1904, 1906, 1907, 1908, 1909, 1911)
Ginger Beaumont (1902)
Paul Waner (1927, 1934, 1936)
Arky Vaughan (1935)
Debs Garms (1940)

Dick Groat (1960)
Roberto Clemente (1961, 1964, 1965, 1967)
Matty Alou (1966)
Dave Parker (1977, 1978)
Bill Madlock (1981, 1983)
Freddy Sanchez (2006)

Home Run Champions
Tommy Leach (1902)
Ralph Kiner (1946, 1947, 1948, 1949, 1950, 1951, 1952)
Willie Stargell (1971, 1973)
Pedro Álvarez  (2013)

See also
Chuck Tanner Baseball Manager of the Year Award
Baseball awards
List of MLB awards

References

Awa
Pittsburgh Pirates